The Lehigh Valley Steelhawks were a professional indoor football team based in Allentown, Pennsylvania. The Steelhawks began play as an expansion team in the Indoor Football League (IFL) in 2011. 

The Steelhawks moved to the Professional Indoor Football League (PIFL) in 2013, where they made their only championship game appearance to date, losing PIFL Cup III to the Nashville Venom. The team joined American Indoor Football for the 2016 season after the PIFL folded, which lasted one season before that league also folded. They joined the National Arena League for the 2017 and 2018 seasons. The Steelhawks are the Lehigh Valley's second indoor football team, following the defunct Lehigh Valley Outlawz of the Continental Indoor Football League (2005–2008). Both teams played their home games at Stabler Arena. The Steelhawks played their home games at the PPL Center.

The owner of the Steelhawks was Glenn Clark, but sought to sell the team following the 2018 season. After failing to find new ownership for the Steelhawks, the team suspended operations before the 2019 season.

History
In July 2010, the Indoor Football League (IFL) announced that there would be an expansion franchise placed in Lehigh Valley for the 2011 season. It was also announced that the team would be owned by Glenn W. Clark, a Wilmington, Delaware businessman. Later in July the team announced that they had named Dan Kuhn as the team's general manager and would be holding a "Name The Team" contest was held to choose a name for the organization. Over 700 names were submitted and the top five were chosen by management. These names were Vipers, Ironmen, Blast, Gamblers, and Steelhawks. Fans were then asked to vote on the name they thought would be best for the team with over 70% of the votes being cast for Steelhawks. Brooke Trautwein, the fan who submitted the Steelhawks name, was given a prize package that included season tickets and Steelhawks' merchandise.

In August 2013, Clark announced that the Steelhawks would be leaving the IFL for the Professional Indoor Football League (PIFL) after two seasons. The Steelhawks finished in second place overall in the 2013 PIFL season, but lost their semifinal playoff game.

The Steelhawks finished the 2014 season with a 6–6 record and second in the National Conference. The Steelhawks defeated the Trenton Freedom by a score of 49–38 in the National Conference championship game to advance to PIFL Cup III. where they were defeated 43–64 by the Nashville Venom.

In the 2015 season, the Steelhawks announced that they would be moving to the newly constructed PPL Center. They finished fourth overall in the PIFL and lost their semifinal playoff game to the Columbus Lions.

With the PIFL not having enough teams to remain viable, the Steelhawks moved to American Indoor Football (AIF) for the 2016 season. The Steelhawks finished third in the North Division and made it to the division championship game before losing to the West Michigan Ironmen. After the season ended, the team announced it would not be returning to the AIF for the 2017 season.

On July 19, 2016, the Steelhawks announced they had joined the Arena Developmental League (which became the National Arena League) as a charter member of the new league. In the NAL's inaugural 2017 season, the Steelhawks finished in second place overall before losing at home to the third place Columbus Lions in the semifinal playoff game.

Following the season, the Steelhawks franchise's only head coach Chris Thompson left the team to take an offensive coordinator position with the Arena Football League's Albany Empire expansion team for the 2018 season. The Steelhawks hired Danton Barto as the new head coach for the 2018 season and the team finished with a 0–15 record. At the end of the season, owner Glenn Clark and president Mike Clark announced the Steelhawks were for sale. The team announced a hiatus prior to the 2019 season while continuing to seek new ownership. After closing up shop, the team's turf would be acquired by the IFL's Oakland Panthers, who now go by the Bay Area Pathers after a move to San Jose.

Season-by-season results

Current roster

Awards and honors
The following is a list of all Steelhawks players who have won league awards:

References

External links 
Official website

 
2010 establishments in Pennsylvania